The Meet-the-People Sessions (MPS) is a series of one-to-one meetings between elected Members of Parliament (MPs) and their constituents in Singapore. The sessions are usually held once a week at a local constituency office staffed by partisan volunteers. Constituents visit their representative in the hope of resolving their various problems encountered in daily living. The MP will then write letters to the relevant ministry, statutory board or any concerned parties to appeal on behalf of the constituent. These letters are usually accorded a higher priority by the Civil Service as they come from elected Members of Parliament, regardless even from elected opposition MPs as the Singapore Civil Service is ought to accord MPs equally and democratic as based and sworn by the Singapore National Pledge.

Cases deal with a wide range of issues. The list is not exhaustive such as family financial problems (e.g. health-cost issues, jobs seeking, financial assistance), CPF matters, various licenses, HDB-related problems (e.g. subsidised rental housing, obtaining a subsidised HDB flat), immigration issues, and appeals for school admissions and school fee subsidy, neighbor and any other relational disputes.

Almost all Meet-the-People Sessions start after 7pm and can routinely last past midnight based on queue, and are staffed by partisan volunteers.

History
The establishment of these sessions can be traced back to Chief Minister David Marshall of the Labour Front in the 1950s.

Rationale
The rationale for the Meet-the-People Sessions (MPS) is so that Members of Parliament (MPs) can get a feel of the ground. Even Cabinet ministers are required to go to their weekly MPS, although sometimes they may seek help from other MPs to cover duties when they have ministerial duties to attend to.

The 1966 Wee Chong Jin Constitutional Commission had recommended an ombudsman to deal with complaints against the bureaucracy however, Parliament rejected the recommendation and instead preferred that such cases were to be handled by the Members of Parliament themselves or the national Feedback Unit. The need to perform an ombudsman function is probably another rationale for having the Meet-the-People Sessions.

Process
The process of meeting the Members of Parliament varies from constituency to constituency, but follow a general pattern:
 Registration and take queue number.
 Constituent meets the writer who pens the appeal letter (either hand-written or via computer) on behalf of the MP.
 Wait for a queue to consult the MP in person.
 Meet and consult the MP, constituent narrates to the MP of his/her concerns.
 MP will assure the constituent that they will provide assistance to their cases via the letters. For urgent cases, the letter will be typed out, proof-read and sign by the MP and hands it to the constituent on the spot. For typical cases, the letter will be vetted through by the MP and sent out usually after three working days.

Criticism
There have been criticism that MPs do not give sufficient time allowance to each constituent. There have also been criticism that party activists at Meet-the-People Sessions are unable to connect with constituents and that the general attitude of party activists has changed over time, to the organisations detriment. 

Criticisms include the use of standard templates for many of the appeal letters which are repetitive, an inability to accommodate constituents with disabilities and a lack of empathy towards fellow Singaporeans. 

To counter the criticism, the organisation has begun to redesign the "Meet-the-People" Sessions to actually feel the ground in reality, to try and gain back the trust and support of the people that the people had entrusted to them.

See also
Surgery (politics)

References

External links
To Find Your Member of Parliament and the timing of his/her Meet-the-People Session
A Meet-the-People Session Experience

Singaporean culture
Singapore government policies